HAT-P-12b is an extrasolar planet approximately 468 light years away from Earth, orbiting the 13th magnitude K-type star HAT-P-12, which is located in Canes Venatici constellation. It is a transiting hot Jupiter that was discovered by the HATNet Project on April 29, 2009.

HAT-P-12b is a H/He-dominated gas giant planet with a core mass of 11.3 M and is moderately irradiated by its low-metallicity host star. Therefore, HAT-P-12b is most likely an H/He-dominated planet with a core of perhaps ~10 M, and a total metal fraction of ~15%. This makes HAT-P-12b the least massive H/He-dominated gas giant planet found to date; the previous record holder was Saturn.

In 2020, the obtained transmission spectra have revealed that the atmosphere of HAT-P-12b is cloudy, with haze above cloud tops. Water was detected. The prevalence of clouds and hazes in planetary atmosphere was disputed in 2021 though.

In August 2022, this planet and its host star were included among 20 systems to be named by the third NameExoWorlds project.

References

External links

Exoplanets discovered by HATNet
Hot Jupiters
Transiting exoplanets
Exoplanets discovered in 2009
Giant planets
Canes Venatici